Noel Loomis (April 3, 1905 – September 7, 1969) was a writer, principally of western, mystery and science-fiction, in the middle of the 20th century.
Born and raised in the American West, he was sufficiently familiar with that territory to write a useful history of the Wells Fargo company.

Personal life 

Noel Loomis was born Noel Miller Loomis on April 3, 1905, in the Oklahoma Territory town of Wakita, in the Cherokee Strip, and raised in Texico, in the New Mexico Territory, and in the West Texas town of Slaton. 
In later life he lived in Decanso, in the San Diego, California, Back Country from 1956.

He married Dorothy Moore Green, 
who was also a writer,
in 1945.
There is evidence that he had a first wife named Johnie or Jonie, who was the mother of his children.

Career and honors 

 1921 Attended Clarendon College
 1929–1979 Freelance writer
 1930 Attended University of Oklahoma
 1953 National survey of writers' incomes and terms in writers' contracts
 1954–1955 President of Western Writers of America
 1955–1956 President of Hulburd Grove Improvement Association
 1958 Spur Award Novel: Short Cut to Red River by Noel Loomis (Macmillan)
 1958–1969 Instructor in English, San Diego State College, San Diego, California
 1959 Spur Award Short Story: Grandfather Out of the Past by Noel Loomis (Frontiers West)
 1963–1969 Director of Writers Workshop
 American Academy of Political and Social Science
 American Association of University Professors
 American Historical Association
 PEN International
He also worked variously as a printer, newspaperman and editor.

Writings 
Selected works.

Fiction 

 Murder Goes to Press (1937)
 City of Glass (1942, Startling Stories, exp. 1955 by Columbia Publications)
 Iron Men (1945, Startling Stories)
 Electron Eat Electron (1946, Planet Stories)
 Turnover Time (1949, Startling Stories)
 Rim of the Caprock (1952)
 The Buscadero (1953)
 We Breathe For You (1953, Startling Stories)
 The Ultimate Planet (1949, Thrilling Wonder Stories) 
 The Man With the Absolute Motion (1955, as by Silas Water)
 Short Cut to Red River (1958)
 Grandfather Out of the Past (1959)

Non-fiction 

 Pedro Vial and the Roads to Santa Fe, a description of Pedro Vial's exploratory expeditions (1967) (with Abraham P Nasatir)
 The Texan Santa Fe Pioneers (1958)
 Wells Fargo, a history of the Wells Fargo company (1968)

Media work 
 Bonanza TV series, various episodes
 Have Gun, Will Travel TV series, various episodes
 Cheyenne (TV series), 1956 episode: "Mustang Trail"
 Johnny Concho (film directed by Don McGuire), United Artists, 1956
This production, starring Frank Sinatra and other well-known actors, by accounts an unusual production, has to date (2014) never been released on any of the usual portable media, e.g. VHS or DVD.

Other

Editing 
 Linecasting Operator-Machinist, Harding, Edwin B.; Noel M. Loomis, ed.

Teaching 
 1958–1969 Assistant professor of English at San Diego State College in Southern California

References

External links 
 
 
 
 Open Library
 The Encyclopedia of Science Fiction
 
 

1905 births
1969 deaths
American frontier
Western (genre) writers
American mystery writers
American science fiction writers
Historians of the American West
Writing teachers
American male journalists
20th-century American journalists
Pulp fiction writers
News editors
American printers
20th-century American historians
20th-century American novelists
American male novelists
20th-century American male writers
People from Grant County, Oklahoma
People from Curry County, New Mexico
People from Slaton, Texas
20th-century American non-fiction writers